

2008 Series results 
To be included in the standings and subsequently the bonus prize money, a player has to have countable results from two different tournaments. Players finishing in the top three in the series can earn up to $1 million in extra prize money. Roger Federer received the largest US Open pay day of $2.4 Million in 2007 after capturing the title in both the US Open Series and the US Open championship. In 2008, the men's  series leader Rafael Nadal received US$570,000 for his semifinal finish with a bonus of US$250,000. Women's leader Dinara Safina received US$570,000 for her semifinal finish as well.

Men

1 - Rafael Nadal won the series instead of Andy Murray because Nadal defeated Murray in Canada.

Women

References

 
US Open Series